IGH (or derivative) may refer to:

 Igh (trigraph), used in Irish orthography
 Immunoglobulin heavy chain (IgH), the large polypeptide subunit of an antibody
 IGH@, the Immunoglobulin heavy locus, in biology
 Institut IGH, a Croatian company
 Internal geared hubs, used on bicycles
 Inver Grove Heights, Minnesota, U.S.